Agent Backkom: Kings Bear is a 2021 Chinese animated adventure comedy film. Directed by Zhang Yang, the film is a sequel to 2017's Backkom Bear: Agent 008, which in turn is based on the Backkom animated series.

Plot
Backkom goes on his quest to becoming a competent agent.

Release
The film was scheduled to be released in China in February 2020, but was not released due to COVID-19. It is scheduled to release in the second quarter of 2021.

References

External links

2021 films
Chinese animated films
Animated adventure films
Animated comedy films
Films about polar bears
2021 computer-animated films
2021 adventure films
2021 comedy films
2020s adventure comedy films